KSJI (91.1 FM) is a radio station broadcasting a Christian Contemporary format. Licensed to St. Joseph, Missouri, the station is an owned and operated affiliate of Spirit FM, a network of 22 Christian music stations all over Missouri.

References

External links

Contemporary Christian radio stations in the United States
SJI